The Life is a Ugandan drama feature film created, written and directed by Nana Kagga. The film features Ugandan actors including Gasuza Lwanga, Maureen Nankya, Elvis ‘Vamposs’ Kirya, Tibba Murungi, Susan Nava.
M-NET secured film screening rights and the film was shown on its Africa Magic channels.

Plot
The Life is about friendship and betrayal.  It is set on the Ugandan urban life scene and it tells an interwoven story of a group of 20-something friends from different backgrounds and the extremes they are prepared to go to as they try to achieve what they consider their dreams.

Production
The film was shot at different locations in Kampala, Uganda. It was Savannah MOON's maiden full-length feature film production and Nana Kagga's debut at writing and directing.

Release
M-Net secured film screening rights for The Life and the film was shown on its Africa Magic channels.
The Soundtrack for the film was sung by Ruyonga, a prominent Ugandan rapper.

Cast
Maureen Jolly Nankya as Anna, an aspiring Musician, girlfriend to Jaguar
Gasuza Lwanga as Tendo a.k.a. “Jaguar”, a record selling Musician at top of the game, married to Nekesa, boyfriend to Anna
 Iryn Naddamba as Nekesa,  Jaguar's wife and best friend to Anna and Priscilla
 Elvis ‘Vamposs’ Kirya) as “Smokey Luciano”, an aspiring Musician and Jaguar's former best friend 
 Annet Namukassa as Vixen, an established Musician and pretty girl
 Susan Nava as Suzan, a TV presenter, a know it all
 Boxa Franklin as Paulo- Jaguar's Manager, a shady character. Manager to several aspiring musicians including Anna
 Tibba Murungi as Priscilla.  – Nekesa and Anna's best friend, the sensible one
 Onoh Ozongwu as Vixen's husband
 Paris Shyla as Milly, Anna's sister from the village
 Clare Senkusa as Claire,  – Nekesa's sister, living with her and Jaguar
 Nassozi as landlady
 James Kyambadde as part of funeral procession

See also
 Beneath The Lies - The Series
 Savannah MOON
 Damage (2016 film)

References

External links
 
 Profile Engine

2012 films
Films shot in Uganda
Films set in Uganda
Films about music and musicians
2012 drama films
English-language Ugandan films
Ugandan drama films
2010s English-language films